Sidi Boubker may refer to:
Sidi Boubker, Jerada Province
Sidi Boubker, Rehamna Province